Femme Fatale is the debut studio album by American hard rock band Femme Fatale, released in 1988 through MCA Records. It peaked at #141 on The Billboard 200 the following year.

The song "Touch and Go" was featured on the soundtrack of the 1988 film License to Drive.
The CD was reissued in September 2022 by Rock Candy Records with 4 bonus track.

Track listing
"Waiting for the Big One" (Rich Neighbor, David N. Cole) - 4:23
"Falling In and Out of Love" (Mazzi Rawd, Lorraine Lewis) - 3:48
"My Baby's Gun" (Rawd, Lewis) - 3:35
"Back in Your Arms Again" (Rawd, Lewis, Mick Nichols) - 4:18
"Rebel" (Reg Laws) - 4:28
"Fortune & Fame" (Rawd) - 3:34
"Touch and Go" (Rawd, Lewis, Danny Wilde) - 4:07
"If" (Rawd, Lewis) - 3:56
"Heat the Fire" (Rawd, Lewis) - 3:52
"Cradle's Rockin'" (Rawd, Lewis) - 3:14

Personnel

Band members
Lorraine Lewis - lead vocals, tambourine
Bill D'Angelo - guitar
Mazzi Rawd - guitar, keyboards, backing vocals
Rick Rael - bass, backing vocals
Bobby Murray - drums, backing vocals

Production
Jim (H. M.) Faraci - producer
David N. Cole - producer, engineer and mixing of track 1, mixing of track 2
Charlie Brocco - engineer
Brian Foraker - mixing of tracks 3 and 4
Greg Fulginti - mastering

References

External links
Femme Fatale information

1988 debut albums
MCA Records albums